Takuji Nakamura (1 April 1897 – 31 January 1988) was a Japanese painter. His work was part of the painting event in the art competition at the 1936 Summer Olympics.

References

1897 births
1988 deaths
20th-century Japanese painters
Japanese painters
Olympic competitors in art competitions
People from Niigata Prefecture